Juri Cisotti (born 5 May 1993) is an Italian professional footballer who plays as a midfielder in Romania for Oțelul Galați.

Club career
On 11 September 2018, he joined Maltese Premier League club Mosta.

Honours
Oțelul Galați
Liga III: 2021–22

References

External links

1993 births
People from Tolmezzo
Footballers from Friuli Venezia Giulia
Living people
Italian footballers
Association football midfielders
U.S. Triestina Calcio 1918 players
A.C. ChievoVerona players
Latina Calcio 1932 players
Spezia Calcio players
HNK Rijeka players
HNK Rijeka II players
L.R. Vicenza players
Casertana F.C. players
Mosta F.C. players
Sliema Wanderers F.C. players
ASC Oțelul Galați players
Serie B players
Serie C players
Croatian Football League players
Maltese Premier League players
Italian expatriate footballers
Expatriate footballers in Croatia
Expatriate footballers in Malta
Expatriate footballers in Romania